Andrew Meads (born 2 February 1977) is an Australian former professional rugby league footballer who played in the 1990s and 2000s.

Background
A Townsville Brothers junior, Meads attended Kirwan State High School.

Playing career
In 1995, he signed with the newly-established North Queensland Cowboys, one of two 18-year-olds in the squad, alongside Aaron Ketchell.

In Round 22 of the 1995 ARL season, Meads made his first grade debut for the Cowboys in a 4–66 loss to the Sydney Bulldogs, his lone appearance for the club in first grade.

In 1997, he joined the Balmain Tigers and was a member of their Jersey Flegg Cup winning side. He made his first grade debut for the club in 1998, playing 12 games for them over two seasons, including the club's last ever game as a first grade side, a 14–42 loss to the Canberra Raiders. After Balmain merged with the Western Suburbs Magpies, Meads was not offered a contract to play with the Wests Tigers.

In 2002, after a stint with the St George Illawarra Dragons in which he didn't play first grade, Meads moved to the Parramatta Eels and played eight games for them over two seasons.

Statistics

ARL/NRL

Post-playing career
Following his retirement, Meads returned to Townsville and spent time as the North Queensland Cowboys' wrestling coach.

References

1977 births
Living people
Australian rugby league players
Balmain Tigers players
North Queensland Cowboys players
Parramatta Eels players
Rugby league locks
Rugby league players from Townsville